Tennessee elected its members August 9–10, 1821, after the term began but before the new Congress convened.

See also 
 1820 and 1821 United States House of Representatives elections
 List of United States representatives from Tennessee

1821
Tennessee
United States House of Representatives